Bill Brown (April 28, 1925 – April 25, 2018) was an American athlete who competed in the 1951 Pan American Games. He was a member of the American relay team which won the gold medal in the 4×400 metres event. In the 800 metre competition he won the silver medal. Brown had a career as an educator and coach at Bel Air High School in Bel Air, Maryland. He was inducted in the Maryland State Athletic Hall of Fame in 1976. He died on April 25, 2018, at the age of 92.

References
Bill Brown's obituary
profile

1925 births
2018 deaths
20th-century African-American sportspeople
American male sprinters
American male middle-distance runners
Pan American Games track and field athletes for the United States
Athletes (track and field) at the 1951 Pan American Games
Pan American Games gold medalists for the United States
Pan American Games silver medalists for the United States
Pan American Games medalists in athletics (track and field)
Medalists at the 1951 Pan American Games